Sebastián Pinto (born 5 February 1986) is a Chilean former professional footballer who played as a striker. His last team was Chilean Primera B club Deportes Temuco.

Career

Begins of his career
Pinto began his career in the youth categories of Universidad de Chile, but had no regularity and was sent on loan to Cobreloa to gain more experience. He played also in
Santos, Godoy Cruz, Audax Italiano and the Italian club
Varese between 2008 and 2011.

O'Higgins, Bursaspor and Millonarios
In 2011, he came to O'Higgins where he was the second top-scorer of the tournament. In January 2012 he arrived at Turkish football club Bursaspor, being the top-scorer of the national cup with 5 goals. After almost three years at the club, he left finishing with a total of 65 games played and 29 goals. After that he went to Millonarios F.C. in 2014, playing 4 matches and scoring 1 goal.

Back to Chile

In 2015, he come back to O'Higgins, signing to the team for the Clausura 2014-15.

International career

His debut for the Chile national team in 2006 on an unofficial friendly against the Aragon official football team. He returned later in 2011, in a friendly against Paraguay where he scored a hat-trick (one goal on a penalty shot).

Personal life
He is the son of the journalist and television presenter Carlos Pinto. His sister, Carla, is a DJ who took part in the reality show  in 2013.

References

External links
Official Club Player Profile 
Sebastián Pinto at BDFA.com.ar 
Sebastián Pinto – Argentine Primera statistics at Fútbol XXI 

1986 births
Living people
Footballers from Santiago
Chilean footballers
Chilean expatriate footballers
Chile international footballers
Universidad de Chile footballers
Cobreloa footballers
Santos FC players
Godoy Cruz Antonio Tomba footballers
Audax Italiano footballers
S.S.D. Varese Calcio players
Bursaspor footballers
Millonarios F.C. players
O'Higgins F.C. footballers
Eskişehirspor footballers
Quilmes Atlético Club footballers
Club Deportivo Palestino footballers
Deportes Temuco footballers
Chilean Primera División players
Campeonato Brasileiro Série A players
Argentine Primera División players
Serie B players
Süper Lig players
Categoría Primera A players
Primera B de Chile players
Chilean expatriate sportspeople in Brazil
Chilean expatriate sportspeople in Argentina
Chilean expatriate sportspeople in Italy
Chilean expatriate sportspeople in Turkey
Chilean expatriate sportspeople in Colombia
Expatriate footballers in Brazil
Expatriate footballers in Argentina
Expatriate footballers in Italy
Expatriate footballers in Turkey
Expatriate footballers in Colombia
Association football forwards